Barry Paul "Gibby" Gibbs (born September 28, 1948) is a Canadian former professional ice hockey defenceman. He was selected first overall in the 1966 NHL Amateur Draft.

Playing career
During his NHL career, Gibbs played for the Boston Bruins, Minnesota North Stars, Atlanta Flames, St. Louis Blues and Los Angeles Kings. He retired in 1981.

Barry came to Minnesota from Boston in the deal that brought Tom Williams to the North Stars. He played junior hockey at Estevan, Sask. and in the Boston organization at Oklahoma City of the CHL.  He comes from a family of seven, four boys and three girls. His nephew, Darren Gibbs, has worked as an on-ice official in the National Hockey League since 1997.

On the final weekend of the 1969-70 season, Gibbs scored the only goal in Minnesota's 1-0 victory over the Philadelphia Flyers on April 4. The goal came on an 80-foot shot that somehow eluded Flyers' goalie Bernie Parent.  The loss eliminated the Flyers from playoff contention. He was traded along with Phil Myre and Curt Bennett from the Flames to the Blues for Bob MacMillan, Dick Redmond, Yves Bélanger and a second‐round selection in the 1979 NHL Entry Draft (23rd overall–Mike Perovich) on December 12, 1977.

Career statistics

Awards
 CMJHL First All-Star Team – 1967

References

External links

1948 births
Living people
Atlanta Flames players
Boston Bruins draft picks
Boston Bruins players
Birmingham Bulls (CHL) players
Canadian ice hockey defencemen
Estevan Bruins players
Houston Apollos players
Ice hockey people from Saskatchewan
Los Angeles Kings players
Minnesota North Stars players
National Hockey League first-overall draft picks
National Hockey League first-round draft picks
Oklahoma City Blazers (1965–1977) players
Oklahoma City Stars players
Sportspeople from Lloydminster
St. Louis Blues players
Canadian expatriate ice hockey players in the United States